Miconia macrothyrsa is a species of shrub in the family Melastomataceae. It is native to South America.

References

macrothyrsa
Flora of Brazil
Flora of Peru